The 2003 West Berkshire Council election took place on 1 May 2003 to elect members of West Berkshire Council in Berkshire, England. The whole council was up for election with boundary changes since the last election in 2000 reducing the number of seats by two. The Liberal Democrats lost overall control of the council to no overall control.

Background
At the last election in 2000 the Liberal Democrats held control of the council with 28 councillors, compared to 25 for the Conservatives and there was 1 independent councillor. However boundary changes took place for the 2003 election, which reduced the number of seats from 54 to 52 and affected all but 3 of the wards.

Election result
Both the Conservatives and Liberal Democrats won 26 seats, meaning that the Liberal Democrats lost the majority on the council that they had held for the previous 12 years. The Liberal Democrat leader on the council, Lena Rust was defeated in Basildon ward by the Conservatives, while in Westwood ward the Conservatives gained the seat by 4 votes after 4 recounts. However the Liberal Democrats did pick up a seat in the new Theale ward.

Following the election the Liberal Democrats were able to continue running the council due to the chairman's casting vote.

Ward results

By-elections between 2003 and 2007

Victoria
The Liberal Democrats remained in control of the council with the chairman's casting vote after retaining Victoria ward in a by-election on 4 December 2003.

Thatcham North
A by-election was held in Thatcham North on 5 May 2005 after Liberal Democrat councillor Bob Judge resigned from the council. The seat was gained for the Conservatives by Sheila Ellison with a majority of 175 votes over the Liberal Democrats, which gave the Conservatives a majority on the council.

Pangbourne
A by-election was held in Pangbourne ward on 20 April 2006 after the resignation of Conservative councillor Susie Kemp. The seat was held for the Conservatives by Pamela Bale with a majority of 574 votes over the Liberal Democrats.

References

2003
2003 English local elections
2000s in Berkshire